Okanagana striatipes is a species of cicada in the family Cicadidae. It is found in North America.

Subspecies
These two subspecies belong to the species Okanagana striatipes:
 Okanagana striatipes beameri Davis, 1930
 Okanagana striatipes striatipes (Haldeman, 1852)

References

Further reading

 

Articles created by Qbugbot
Insects described in 1852
Okanagana